Murad Chopanov (born 18 September 1998) is a Russian judoka.

He is the gold medallist of the 2021 Judo Grand Slam Kazan in the -66 kg category.

References

External links
 

1998 births
Living people
Russian male judoka
20th-century Russian people
21st-century Russian people